Ma Jikong (1914–2001) was a People's Republic of China politician. He was born in Feicheng, Tai'an, Shandong. He was People's Congress Chairman of Jiangxi. He was a delegate to the 2nd National People's Congress and 6th National People's Congress.

1914 births
2001 deaths
People's Republic of China politicians from Shandong
Chinese Communist Party politicians from Shandong
Delegates to the 2nd National People's Congress
Delegates to the 6th National People's Congress
Delegates to the National People's Congress from Yunnan
Deputy Communist Party secretaries of Yunnan
Mayors of Jining
Standing Members of the Jiangxi Party Standing Committee
Standing Members of the Gansu Party Standing Committee
National Tsing Hua University alumni
People from Feicheng